The Zambian ambassador in Beijing is the official representative of the Government in Lusaka to the Government of the China.

List of representatives

References

 
Zambia
China